Andrea Mantovani (born 22 June 1984) is an Italian footballer who plays in the defender position.

Club career

Torino
Mantovani started his career at Torino Calcio. He was the member of Allievi Nazionali Under-17 team in 2000–01 season. In 2002–03 season, he occasionally received first team call-up, and made his debut on 19 January 2003 against Como, which he replaced Gianluca Comotto at half-time. The match ended in 0–0 draw.

After Torino relegated in 2003, he was loaned to Serie B side Triestina. In 2004–05 season, Mantovani returned to Turin and played as one of the regular starter, he was awarded no.4 shirt. The team won promotion playoffs but then went bankrupt. FIGC allowed a new successor team admitted in 2005–06 Serie B but the players were also allowed to leave on free transfer.

Chievo
In August 2005, he was signed by Serie A side Chievo along with teammate Giovanni Marchese and on 30 August sold to Torino's rival Juventus in co-ownership for a nominal fees of €1,000. He was immediately loaned back to Chievo and played 4 league matches.

Partially due to 2006 Italian football scandal, Juventus terminated all ongoing co-ownership deal in June 2006, and Mantovani was sold back to Chievo for about €301,000. He played 3 out of 4 European matches of Chievo, which exited in both UEFA Champions League 3rd qualifying round, and UEFA Cup first round.

Mantovani played 15 league start in 2006–07 season. Chievo was slipped from 4th (post-trail) or 7th (pre-trail) in 2005–06 to 18th that season, and Mantovani followed the team relegated to Serie B. At Serie B, Mantovani became an absolute starter, started 36 out of 42 matches, missed round 16 and round 22 due to suspension, 1 match as substitute and rested on last round (round 42).

In June 2008, he signed a new 4-year contract with the club. After returning to Serie A, he continued to play as a regular and helped the team survive in the relegation battle. In the 2009–10 season, he played as left-back or one of the 3 central defenders in 352 formation and helped the team remain in Serie A. He either ahead Bojan Jokić as left back or partnered with Jokić on the left flank: Jokić as wingback and Mantovani as left central defender.

Palermo
On 6 July 2011, after weeks of speculation surrounding his future, Mantovani agreed a four-year deal with Palermo with €3.5 million transfer fee, thus re-joining his former Chievo head coach Stefano Pioli to Sicily. He debuted with the rosanero on 28 July against Thun in Europa League.

He spent the 2013–14 season on loan to Bologna. He was subsequently released on mutual consent on 11 September 2014.

Perugia
He was signed by Perugia in 2015.

Vicenza
On 27 July 2015 he was signed by Vicenza Calcio.

Novara
On 30 January 2016 Mantovani was signed by Novara, with Francesco Signori moved to opposite direction.

International career
He was a part of the Italy national under-19 team which won the 2003 European Under-19 Championship, and played 16 games for the Italy national under-19 team.

He also played at 2001 UEFA European Under-16 Football Championship, 2006 UEFA European Under-21 Football Championship and 2007 UEFA European Under-21 Football Championship.

Honours

Club
Chievo
Serie B: 2007–08

Torino
Serie B Runner-up: 2004–05

International
Italy U-19
European Under-19 Championship: 2003

Italy U-20
Under-20 Four Nations Tournament: 2006

References

External links
 National team official statistics
 Profile at AIC.Football.it  
 
 

1984 births
Living people
Italian footballers
Italy youth international footballers
Italy under-21 international footballers
Serie A players
Serie B players
Torino F.C. players
U.S. Triestina Calcio 1918 players
A.C. ChievoVerona players
Palermo F.C. players
Bologna F.C. 1909 players
L.R. Vicenza players
Novara F.C. players
Association football defenders
Footballers from Turin